Ou Zixia (born 24 September 1995) is a Chinese field hockey player.

She competed for the China women's national field hockey team at the 2016 Summer Olympics.

References

External links
 

1995 births
Living people
Chinese female field hockey players
Field hockey players at the 2016 Summer Olympics
Field hockey players at the 2020 Summer Olympics
Olympic field hockey players of China
Field hockey players at the 2018 Asian Games
Asian Games bronze medalists for China
Asian Games medalists in field hockey
Medalists at the 2018 Asian Games